The 2021–22 Primera División Femenina de Fútbol was the 34th edition of Spain's highest women's football league, the 21st since the inception of the Superliga Femenina. The league began on 5 September 2021 and finished on 15 May 2022.

Barcelona were the defending champions. They defended the title with a perfect season (30 wins in 30 matches).

Teams

Stadia and locations

Personnel and sponsorship

Managerial changes

League table

Standings

Results

Positions by round
The table lists the positions of teams after each week of matches. In order to preserve chronological evolvements, any postponed matches are not included to the round at which they were originally scheduled, but added to the full round they were played immediately afterwards.

Statistics

Top goalscorers

Most assists

Hat-tricks

Scoring 

 First goal of the season:  Bruna Vilamala for Barcelona against Granadilla (4 September 2021)
 Last goal of the season:  Nerea Eizagirre for Real Sociedad against Deportivo Alavés (15 May 2022)

Discipline 
Player

 Most yellow cards: 8
  Ana González (Real Betis)
 Most red cards: 1
 15 players

Team

 Most yellow cards: 53
 Real Betis
 Most red cards: 4
 Real Betis

Number of teams by autonomous community

References

External links
Official Website 
Primera División (women) at La Liga 

2021-22
Spa
1
women's